The kreuzer was a German silver coin. Kreuzer may also refer to:

People
Andrea Kreuzer (born 1984), Austrian figure skater
Christoph Kreuzer (born 1982), Dutch ski jumper
Erwin Kreuzer (1878 – 1953), a German bishop of the Old Catholic Church
Gottfried Kreuzer (active mid-1970s), Austrian luger
Hansüli Kreuzer (born 1950), Swiss cross-country skier
Heinrich Kreuzer  (1819 – 1900), Austrian tenor
Hermann Kreuzer (active 1880), German rugby player
Jakob Kreuzer (born 1995), Austrian footballer 
June Kreuzer (born 1944), U.S. politician
Lisa Kreuzer (born 1945), German television and film actor
Martin Kreuzer (born 1962), German Mathematics professor and Grandmaster of Correspondence Chess
Matthew Kreuzer (born 1989), Australian rules footballer
Niklas Kreuzer (born 1993), German footballer
Oscar Kreuzer (1887 - 1968), German tennis player
Oliver Kreuzer (born 1965), German footballer
Victoria Kreuzer (born 1989), Swiss ski mountaineer and mountain runner

Other uses
Kreuzer P Class, a type of German heavy cruiser planned in the 1930s
Kreuzer-Pelton House, a historic house erected in 1722 in New York, New York
The Kreuzer Cup, a controversial Australian football match involving Matthew Kreuzer

See also
Kreutzer (disambiguation)

ru:Крейцер